New Age is the second album by Panamian singer-songwriter Eddy Lover. It was released on March 15, 2011. It included the hits Mas Allá Del Sol and Por Un Beso which were previously released on the EP 6 Super Hits.

Track listing

References

2011 albums
Machete Music albums
Eddy Lover albums